General Charles Douglas (C. D.) Jackson (March 16, 1902 – September 18, 1964) was a United States government propagandist and senior executive of Time Inc. As an expert on psychological warfare he served in the Office of Strategic Services in World War II and later as Special Assistant to the President in the Eisenhower administration.

Life and career
Jackson was born in New York City. After graduation from Princeton University in 1924, he entered the private sector. In 1931, Jackson took a position with Time Inc. In 1940, he was President of the Council for Democracy. From 1942 to 1943, he served as special assistant to the Ambassador to Turkey. From 1943 to 1945, he served with the OSS. From 1944 to 1945 he was Deputy Chief at the Psychological Warfare Division, SHAEF.

After the war, he became Managing Director of Time-Life International from 1945 to 1949. He later became publisher of Fortune Magazine. From 1951 to 1952, he served as president of the anticommunist Free Europe Committee. He was a speech writer for Dwight Eisenhower's successful 1952 presidential campaign. He was assigned to be Eisenhower's liaison between the newly-created CIA and the Pentagon.

From February 1953 to March 1954, Jackson served as adviser to the President on psychological warfare. He worked closely with the Psychological Strategy Board and was a member of the Operations Coordinating Board. He was also a member of the Committee on International Information Activities, which was known, after its chairman, William Harding Jackson, as the Jackson Committee.

During 1953 and 1954, Jackson was key in establishing the Bilderberg Group and ensuring American participation. He attended meetings of the group in 1954, 1957, 1958, 1960, 1961, 1962, 1963, and 1964.

Jackson was a defender of Radio Free Europe, stating, "Over the years, Radio Free Europe has never, in a single broadcast or leaflet, deviated from its essential policy, and did not broadcast a single program during the recent Polish and Hungarian developments which could be described as an 'incitement' program."

He later served in a position at the United Nations. From 1958 to 1960, he served as a speechwriter and White House manager after the departure of Sherman Adams and the death of John Foster Dulles. In 1960, he was publisher of Life magazine.

Jackson became acquainted with Whittaker Chambers at Time Inc. He developed a harsh opinion of Chambers as a psychopath. During the first two years of the Eisenhower administration, Jackson urged strong action by the President in dealing with personalities like Senator Joseph McCarthy and Chambers. In Jackson's opinion, they were damaging the anticommunist cause with self-serving and unstable behavior. Sherman Adams, Chief of Staff urged a more moderate, political approach, which the President followed.

After Abraham Zapruder took the famous film in Dallas on November 22, 1963, Jackson purchased it on behalf of Time/Life to "protect the integrity of the film." Upon viewing it on Sunday morning, he ordered it locked in a vault at the Time/Life building in Manhattan.

See also
U.S. President's Committee on Information Activities Abroad

References

External links
Papers of Marie McCrum (Secretary to C.D. Jackson), Dwight D. Eisenhower Presidential Library

1902 births
1964 deaths
Military personnel from New York City
Princeton University alumni
Psychological warfare theorists
United States Army generals